Amazing Greys is a British game show that aired on ITV, co-hosted by Paddy McGuinness and  Angela Rippon. It was aired from 12 April to 17 May 2014 and ran for six episodes.

Production
A pilot episode was recorded at Fountain Studios in Wembley on 19 September 2013 and presented solely by McGuinness. However, when the first series began filming, Rippon joined as his co-host. It was pre-recorded at The London Studios between 25 February and 20 March 2014.

Overview
The show proposes to pair a duo, an 'older star with a younger partner'. The challenger can win £10,000, but in order to win this, the challenger must defeat the 'greys' on two games out of the three played.

Greys

References

External links

2010s British game shows
2014 British television series debuts
2014 British television series endings
ITV game shows
Television series by Warner Bros. Television Studios